NDMC may refer to:-
 N-Desmethylclozapine
 National Drought Mitigation Center
 New Delhi Municipal Council, India
 North Delhi Municipal Corporation, India
 National Defence Medical Centre, Canada
 National Defense Medical Center, Taiwan
 National Disaster Management Centre, South Africa
 Notre Dame of Midsayap College, Philippines